Cesario Alvero Azucena Jr., popularly known as Ces Azucena or C.A. Azucena, (June 16 1938 - November 27 2021) is a prominent labor lawyer, professor, management consultant, and author in the Philippines.

Education
Azucena obtained a Bachelor of Laws degree from Ateneo Law School, a Master of Public Administration from the University of the Philippines, and has attended courses in the Master of Business Administration program of De La Salle Professional Schools.

Human resource career
Azucena was once an organizer and president of a labor union of teachers. He worked as a human resource manager in business firms and non-profit organizations for more than twenty years. He was accredited as a Fellow in Personnel Management by the Personnel Management Association of the Philippines, the umbrella organization of all human resource practitioners in the country.

Law practice
Azucena is currently Chairman of the Labor Law Department at Ateneo Law School. He is also a faculty member and bar reviewer in San Beda College of Law and the University of the Philippines. He is a professorial lecturer in the MBA-JD Consortium of De La Salle Professional Schools and Far Eastern University Institute of Law.

Azucena is a partner in IDLAMA Law Offices, a Makati-based law firm. He remains a retained consultant to several business firms and a frequent lecturer and resource speaker in corporate and public seminars throughout the country.

Azucena has written a gamut of books and articles on labor law and labor-management relations in the Philippines. His works are often cited in decisions penned by justices of the Philippine Supreme Court. His widely published books are either required or suggested reading material in several law, business, and graduate schools in the country.

Professional awards
Azucena has received awards for professional dedication, leadership, and scholarly work. He received Sikap-Gawa Industrial Peace Award from the Bishops'-Businessmen's Conference of the Philippines, Outstanding Achievement Award from the Personnel Management Association of the Philippines, and the Supreme Court Centenary Book Award from the Supreme Court of the Philippines during its centennial anniversary celebrations on June 8, 2001.

Publications
The Labor Code with Comments and Cases: Volume I. Rex Book Store, 2007.
The Labor Code with Comments and Cases: Volume II. Rex Book Store, 2007.
Everyone's Labor Code. Rex Book Store, 2007.
Labor Laws Source Book. Rex Book Store, 2007.
Essential Labor Laws. Rex Book Store, 2004.
Democracy and Socialism: A Curriculum of Contentions. Rex Book Store.

External links
Personnel Management Association of the Philippines
Supreme Court of the Philippines
Rex Book Store
Ateneo Law School
De La Salle Professional Schools/Far Eastern University MBA-JD Consortium
University of the Philippines College of Law
San Beda College of Law

Ateneo de Manila University alumni
Academic staff of Ateneo de Manila University
20th-century Filipino lawyers
21st-century Filipino lawyers
Filipino writers
Living people
Year of birth missing (living people)
Academic staff of San Beda University
University of the Philippines alumni
De La Salle University alumni
Academic staff of the University of the Philippines
Academic staff of De La Salle University